The Agricultural Marketing Agreement Act of 1937 provides authority for federal marketing orders, and also reaffirmed the marketing agreements provisions of the Agricultural Adjustment Act of 1933. 

Under the authority of this permanent law and subsequent amendments, marketing orders have been established for milk as well as numerous fruits, vegetables, and specialty crops.  

The Agricultural Marketing Agreement of 1937 created the Raisin Administrative Committee, which was the subject of the 2013 and 2015 Supreme Court case Horne v. Department of Agriculture.

See also
Marketing agreements
Marketing orders and agreements
Agricultural Adjustment Act of 1938
Agricultural Marketing Service

References

United States federal agriculture legislation
Agricultural marketing in the United States